Edward Peerman Moore (October 20, 1897 – February 9, 1968) was an American rower who competed in the 1920 Summer Olympics.

In 1920, he was part of the American boat from the United States Naval Academy (USNA), which won the gold medal in the men's eight. He graduated from USNA in 1921.

References

References
 

1897 births
1968 deaths
Rowers at the 1920 Summer Olympics
Olympic gold medalists for the United States in rowing
American male rowers
Medalists at the 1920 Summer Olympics